Lt. Albert Luvian Wade (20 September 1884 – 28 April 1917) was a Scottish rugby union player. He was killed in World War I.

Early life
Wade, known as Bertie, was born in Glasgow. He attended Dulwich College, where he captained the First XV.

Rugby union career

Military service
Wade was killed at Oppy Wood, near Arras on 28 April 1917, whilst serving as a Lieutenant in 17th Battalion, The Middlesex Regiment, on temporary attachment to a trench mortar battery. He was 32 years of age and has no known grave, being commemorated on the Arras Memorial.

References

External links
 "An entire team wiped out by the Great War".  The Scotsman, 6 November 2009

1884 births
1917 deaths
Scottish rugby union players
Scotland international rugby union players
British military personnel killed in World War I
Rugby union scrum-halves
Barbarian F.C. players
Rugby union players from Glasgow
People educated at Dulwich College
Middlesex Regiment officers
British Army personnel of World War I